Venosa is a town and comune in Italy.

Venosa may also refer to:

People
Carlo Gesualdo, also known as Gesualdo da Venosa, Italian nobleman and composer
Robert Venosa, American artist

Plants
Arnica venosa, an herb commonly known as Shasta County arnica, endemic to California
Brassavola venosa, a species of orchid
Chione venosa, a species of flowering plant in the family Rubiaceae
Disciotis venosa, a fungus in the family Morchellaceae, commonly known as the veiny cup fungus or cup morel
Diospyros venosa, a tree in the family Ebenaceae
Dracula venosa, a species of orchid
Haworthiopsis venosa, a species of succulent flowering plant in the family Asphodelaceae
Lysimachia venosa, a plant in the family Myrsinaceae commonly known as veined yellow loosestrife
Macaranga venosa, a species of plant in the family Euphorbiaceae endemic to French Polynesia
Melanthera venosa, a species of aster, also known as spreading nehe
Notelaea venosa, a plant of Australia commonly known as veined mock-olive, smooth mock-olive, large-leaved mock-olive and large mock-olive
Onobrychis venosa, an herb in the family Fabaceae, also known as veined sainfoin
Senegalia venosa, a legume in the family Fabaceae
Vangueria venosa, a species of flowering plant in the family Rubiaceae
Virola venosa, a tree in the family Myristicaceae

Animals
Abantis venosa, a butterfly in the family Hesperiidae, also known as the veined skipper or veined paradise skipper
Aedophron venosa, a moth in the family Noctuidae
Agylla venosa, a moth in the family Erebidae
Cacozophera venosa, a species of snout moth
Carnarvonia venosa, a fossilised arthropod
Colotis venosa, a butterfly in the family Pieridae, commonly known as the no patch tip
Ctenucha venosa, a moth in the family Erebidae, also known as the veined ctenucha moth
Eudonia venosa, a moth in the family Crambidae endemic to Hawaii
Lemyra venosa, a moth in the family Erebidae
Polyocha venosa, a species of snout moth
Prabhasa venosa, a moth in the family Erebidae
Rapana venosa, a sea snail, commonly known as the veined rapa whelk or Asian rapa whelk
Tachina venosa, a species of fly in the family Tachinidae

Other
Venosa Airfield, a unit of the World War II Foggia Airfield Complex in Italy

Taxonomy disambiguation pages